Alexander Brunschwig (September 11, 1901 – August 7, 1969) was born in El Paso, Texas. He died in 1969 at the age of 67 of coronary disease.

Brunschwig developed pelvic exenteration surgery, which removes major organs from the patient's pelvic cavity. He performed 847 procedures, with a death rate similar to those of others later with more modern anesthesia. Pelvic exenteration is controversial, because it is one of the most aggressive and disfiguring surgeries used in oncology, and has not been subject to controlled clinical trials.

In 1963, Brunschwig maintained that cancer of the uterine cervix, microscopically looked like a viral disease. That has since been proved.

He was in the forefront of implantation of the ureters and construction of substitute bladders from segments of the colon.

He worked with Alexander A. Maximow and William Bloom on their Textbook of Histology.

Further information
Obituary: Classics in Oncology ( a detailed review of his life and contributions).

References

1901 births
1969 deaths
People from El Paso, Texas
American oncologists
American surgeons
20th-century surgeons